Eric James Joseph Massa (born September 16, 1959) is a former American politician who served as a U.S. Representative for the 29th Congressional District of New York. A Democrat, he served in Congress from January 2009 until his resignation in March 2010.  Massa resigned during a pending House Ethics Committee investigation into allegations of sexual misconduct. Massa identified his declining health and the ongoing ethics investigation as the reasons for his resignation; however, he later said that there was a conspiracy "to oust him because he had voted against overhauling health care." It was reported in 2017 that Congress had paid nearly $100,000 to settle the harassment claims made by two male staffers against Massa.

Early life and career
Eric James Joseph Massa was born in Charleston, South Carolina on September 16, 1959. The son of a career naval officer, Massa grew up in various locations, including Argentina and New Orleans. After graduating from the U.S. Naval Academy at Annapolis Massa was on active duty in the Navy for 24 years. He served in the Persian Gulf War and also served as aide to General Wesley Clark. Near the end of his Navy career, he was diagnosed with non-Hodgkin's lymphoma, from which he later recovered.

Upon retirement from the military, Massa moved to Corning, New York to work for the Corning Glass Company in 2001. He lost his job due to downsizing and moved to Washington to work as a Republican staffer for the House Armed Services Committee in 2003. Massa was fired after it became known that he had written to his former boss, Democrat Wesley Clark, with advice on his presidential campaign. Thereafter, Massa joined the Democratic Party. He coordinated veterans' outreach efforts in New Hampshire and Virginia during Clark's unsuccessful 2004 presidential bid.

U.S. House of Representatives

Elections
2006

In 2006, Massa ran for Congress in New York's 29th congressional district on the strength of his military background, which it was hoped would appeal to veterans and to independents who favor a strong defense policy.  During the campaign, Massa positioned himself as strongly opposed to the Iraq war and unrestricted free trade, favoring instead fair trade. Other issues in his platform included expanding farm aid programs, as well as bringing homeland security money to the 29th District.

On Election night, incumbent Republican Rep. Randy Kuhl led Massa by a 52%-48% margin. Massa requested a recount and an accounting of absentee ballots because 6,000 votes separated the two and 10,000 were left to be counted. After a week of waiting, the ballots were approximately even and Congressman Kuhl was re-elected. Massa conceded the election with a telephone call to Congressman Kuhl.

2008

Almost immediately after conceding defeat in 2006, Massa prepared for a rematch against Kuhl in 2008.  The race remained tight through the campaign; however, Massa emerged victorious, defeating Kuhl 51% to 49% (a margin of approximately 4000 votes), although Kuhl did not immediately concede defeat. All voting machines were impounded at Kuhl's request (pending a re-count), with 12,000 absentee ballots to be counted. The recount yielded a margin of victory of approximately 4,000 votes for Massa, and Kuhl conceded the race on November 21. Some press reports attributed Massa's victory to the plurality he attained among voters in Cattaraugus County, which voted for Kuhl in 2004 and 2006.

Tenure
Massa was assigned a seat on the House Armed Services Committee. He also inherited Kuhl's seat on the Agriculture Committee and was given a seat the House Homeland Security Committee.

Massa voted in favor of, and generally supported, the American Recovery and Reinvestment Act of 2009, but has said he finds faults with the legislation. After the act failed to generate the expected stimulus to the Southern Tier economy, Massa claimed that virtually all of the stimulus funds were funneled to the state governments and diverted to interests in New York City.

In April 2009, Massa was noted for his suggestion to close the United States-Mexico border as a response to the 2009 swine flu pandemic, which originated in Mexico. He also was a leading critic of Time Warner Cable's abortive plan to charge a tiered service rate for its high-speed Internet service.

Though he generally supported a health care reform plan, he opposed, and voted against, the plans put forth by the Obama administration, due to the cost, and preferred a single-payer health care system instead.

During the 2009 Netroots Nation convention held in Pittsburgh, PA, Massa told a group of activists that he "will vote adamantly against the interests of my district if I actually think what I am doing is going to be helpful" in regard to a single-payer health care system. Moments later Massa clarified that he meant he would vote against the "opinions" of his constituents if he thought it was the right thing to do. He also controversially exclaimed that Sen. Chuck Grassley's comments describing end-of-life care as "killing Grandma" constitute "an act of treason."

Sexual harassment allegations and resignation from Congress
On October 10, 2009, Massa announced his plans for re-election, saying, "I don't want to play games with people about speculation, I want to be very direct and candid."

On a press conference call on March 3, 2010, Massa announced that his cancer had returned and that he would not seek re-election. In his statement, Massa addressed allegations of sexual harassment, but claimed he would stay on for the remainder of his term.

The next day, March 4, 2010, House Majority Leader Steny Hoyer confirmed that the House Ethics Committee was investigating allegations against Massa of sexual misconduct as the result of a complaint that a senior member of Massa's staff had filed with the committee on February 8, 2010. The investigation was said to involve alleged sexual advances and harassment toward a younger male member of Massa's staff.

At a press conference, Massa described his behavior and his language as "salty," claiming that he had apologized to the parties in question, did not know of the specific allegations, and did not make the decision to retire based upon such allegations.

Massa announced on March 5, 2010, that he would resign his seat in Congress effective 5:00 p.m. on March 8, 2010.  In a published statement on his website, Massa identified his declining health and the ongoing ethics investigation as the reasons for his departure. He apologized in response to the sexual harassment complaint, saying that "There is no doubt in my mind that I did in fact, use language in the privacy of my own home and in my inner office that, after 24 years in the navy, might make a Chief Petty Officer feel uncomfortable. In fact, there is no doubt that this ethics issue is my fault and mine alone."

Massa later claimed that there was a conspiracy to remove him from Congress "because he had voted against overhauling health care." Massa placed specific blame for his resignation on White House Chief of Staff Rahm Emanuel, stating that Emanuel "is the son of the devil's spawn...  He is an individual who would sell his mother to get a vote. He would strap his children to the front end of a steam locomotive." Massa also commented on the following alleged confrontation with Emanuel in the congressional gym locker room:  "I am sitting there showering, naked as a jaybird, and here comes Rahm Emanuel, not even with a towel wrapped around his tush, poking his finger in my chest, yelling at me because I wasn't going to vote for the president's budget...  He goes there to intimidate members of Congress... He's hated me since day one, and now he wins. He'll get rid of me, and this bill will pass." A Democratic spokesperson denied the existence of the alleged conspiracy.

On March 10, 2010, The Washington Post reported that Massa was under investigation for allegations that he had groped multiple male staffers working in his office. The Post reported:

The freshman Democrat told Fox News Channel host Glenn Beck that "not only did I grope [a staffer], I tickled him until he couldn't breathe," then said hours later on CNN's "Larry King Live" that "it is not true" that he groped anyone on his staff.

He told Beck that he resigned from the House because he made the mistake of "getting too familiar with my staff" members, but he told King that he left primarily for health reasons. Massa, 50, has survived non-Hodgkin's lymphoma, but he said he is afraid that he is facing his "third major cancer-recurrence scare."

In his interview with Beck, the married Massa acknowledged that he shared a Washington residence with several unmarried male staffers as a cost-saving measure.

Massa claimed that he contemplated vehicular suicide at least twice on his way back to his home in Corning, New York, following his resignation. Later campaign finance filings revealed that his campaign funds were being used to fund his wife's salary well after his resignation, as well as to pay legal fees stemming from disputes with his staffers. The payments to his wife continued until the end of 2012.

In 2017, the New York Daily News reported that Congress had paid nearly $100,000 to settle the harassment claims made by two male staffers against Massa.

Committee assignments
Committee on Agriculture
Subcommittee on Conservation, Credit, Energy, and Research
Subcommittee on Horticulture and Organic Agriculture
Committee on Armed Services
Subcommittee on Seapower and Expeditionary Forces
Subcommittee on Air and Land Forces
Committee on Homeland Security
Subcommittee on Border, Maritime and Global Counterterrorism
Subcommittee on Transportation Security and Infrastructure Protection

See also

New York's 29th congressional district election, 2006
New York's 29th congressional district election, 2008
New York's 29th congressional district election, 2010
List of federal political sex scandals in the United States

References

External links
Congressman Eric Massa – official U.S. House website (archived shortly before his resignation)
Eric Massa for U.S. Congress – official campaign website (archived in November 2006)
 

|-

1959 births
21st-century American politicians
American people of Italian descent
Democratic Party members of the United States House of Representatives from New York (state)
Living people
Politicians from Corning, New York
United States Naval Academy alumni
United States Navy officers